Elachista flammula is a moth of the family Elachistidae that is endemic to the Australian Capital Territory.

The forewings are yellow, powdered with dark brownish grey-tipped scales in males. The hindwings are grey.

The larvae feed on Carex polyantha. They mine the leaves of their host plant. Several larvae may be found on a single leaf. Pupation takes place outside of the mine, along the fold of the leaf.

References

Moths described in 2011
Endemic fauna of Australia
flammula
Moths of Australia
Taxa named by Lauri Kaila